Ayanda Nkili (born 11 September 1990) is a South African footballer who plays as a defender for Polokwane City.

Club career

Early career 
Nkili started his career at the Stars of Africa football academy in Johannesburg, South Africa. In 2010, he signed his first professional contract with Division 2 side IFK Hässleholm. He became the fourth Stars of Africa graduate to play in Sweden, following in the footsteps of May Mahlangu, Tokelo Rantie and Bradley Ralani.

Örebro 
Following a successful spell with the club, he signed for Superettan club Örebro SK in February 2013. He made his debut for ÖSK on 9 March 2013, playing the full ninety minutes in a 1−0 loss to Falkenbergs FF in the group stage of the Svenska Cupen. In his first season with ÖSK, Nkili featured in 29 league matches, starting all but three, as the club finished as runners-up and were promoted back to the Allsvenskan after a one-year absence.

Career statistics

Honours 
Örebro SK
Superettan Runner-up: 2013
The Atlantic Cup Runner-up: 2014

References

External links

1990 births
Living people
South African soccer players
Association football defenders
Örebro SK players
Superettan players
Allsvenskan players
IFK Hässleholm players
Stellenbosch F.C. players
Polokwane City F.C. players
South African expatriate soccer players
Expatriate footballers in Sweden